Guy Tristan Fordham (born 19 July 1975) is a British former field hockey player who competed in the 2000 Summer Olympics and in the 2004 Summer Olympics. He represented England and won a bronze medal in the men's hockey, at the 1998 Commonwealth Games in Kuala Lumpur.

References

External links

 

1975 births
Living people
British male field hockey players
Olympic field hockey players of Great Britain
Field hockey players at the 2000 Summer Olympics
2002 Men's Hockey World Cup players
Field hockey players at the 2004 Summer Olympics
Commonwealth Games medallists in field hockey
Commonwealth Games bronze medallists for England
Field hockey players at the 1998 Commonwealth Games
Medallists at the 1998 Commonwealth Games